The Men's individual compound W1 archery discipline at the 2020 Summer Paralympics will be contested from September 10 to September 16. Ranking rounds take place on 10 September, while knockout rounds continue on September 16.

In the ranking rounds each archer shoots 72 arrows, and is seeded according to score. In the knock-out stages each archer shoots three arrows per set against an opponent, the scores being aggregated. Losing semifinalists compete in a bronze medal match. As the field contained 12 archers, the four highest ranked archers in the ranking round will receive a bye into the quarter final round.

Ranking Round
PR = Paralympic Record.

Knockout stage

The knockout stages, including medal finals, were scheduled for September 16, 2016. The Knockout matches, in common with the other events in the Archery competition, are single elimination until the semi-finals (were losers play off for bronze), and as with the other individual compound events, the men's compound W1 knockout matches are contested over sets of three arrows for each archer, with the scores aggregated.

References

Archery at the 2020 Summer Paralympics